The 2006 Mongolian National Championship was the thirty-ninth recorded edition of top flight football in Mongolia and the eleventh season of the Mongolian Premier League, which took over as the highest level of competition in the country from the previous Mongolian National Championship. Khoromkhon were champions, their second title, Khasiin Khulguud were  runners up, with Khangarid in third place.

Participating teams

 Baganuur – Baganuur; village/town near Ulaanbaatar to the east
 Darkhan – Darkhan; town in northern Mongolia
 Khangarid – Erdenet; town in northern Mongolia
 Kharaatsai – Ulaanbaatar
 Khasiin Khulguud – Bank team from Ulaanbaatar
 Khoromkhon – Ulaanbaatar
 Khötöl – Khötöl; village/town near Ulaanbaatar
 Selenge Press – Ulaanbaatar
 Mazaalai – Ulaanbaatar
 Ulaanbaatar – team from Ulaanbaatar University
 Zamchin – Ulaanbaatar
 Zamyn-Üüd – Zamyn-Üüd; town in southern Mongolia

Format
The 2006 season consisted of three distinct stage: the first stage consisted of three groups of four teams, with each group playing a single round robin of matches. From this stage, the top two teams in each group in addition to the two third placed teams with the best records advanced to the next set of matches. The second round consisted of two further groups of four teams, with each group again contesting a single round robin of matches. The winners of each group then progressed directly to a single leg final match, whilst the runners up in each group contested a third place play off match.

First stage

Group A

Group B

Group C

Second stage

Group D

Group E

Playoff

Third Place

Final

References

Mongolia Premier League seasons
Mongolia
Mongolia
football